The Georgia national rugby sevens team is a minor national sevens side. Georgia plays every summer in the Rugby Europe Sevens Grand Prix Series.
They have occasionally qualified to play in certain legs of the World Rugby Sevens Series, but they have never been a "core team" on the Sevens Series. Georgia has participated for qualifying for the Olympics, but has never qualified to play in the Olympics.

Players 
Squad for 2022 World Rugby Sevens Challenger Series
  Ioseb Gusharashvili (Black Lion)
  Mirian Modebadze (Black Lion)
  Lasha Lomidze (Black Lion)
  Nikoloz REKHVIASHVILI (RC Kochebi)
  Giorgi Koshadze (RC Kharebi)
  Nikoloz GIGAURI (RC Kazbegi)
  Giorgi GELASHVILI (RC Armia)
  Irakli SIMVSIVE (Aia Kutaisi)
  Giorgi Babunashvili (Black Lion)
  Teimuraz Kokhodze (Aia Kutaisi)
  Levan NARIMANIDZE (RC Kochebi)
  Temo Tchitchinadze (Kochebi RC)
  Giorgi Tchuadze (Academy RC)

Tournament history

Rugby World Cup Sevens

World Rugby Sevens Series

References

External links
 Georgia Sevens team

sevens
National rugby sevens teams